Rural Still Life is the second album by American jazz saxophonist Tom Scott featuring performances recorded in 1968 for the Impulse! label.

Reception
The Allmusic review by Jim Todd awarded the album 1½ stars stating "This 1968 LP from the early days of jazz fusion lacks the seamless merging of styles that would mark the commercial success of Tom Scott's later career. Instead, the 19-year-old reed player and the members of his quartet careen all over the style map with varying degrees of success... At the time of this recording, Scott was already a fixture of the Los Angeles studio scene. As he makes clear on Rural Still Life, jazz was and would remain a side interest only".

Track listing
All compositions by Tom Scott except as indicated
 "Rural Still Life #26" (Mike Lang) - 3:27   
 "Song #1" - 6:34   
 "Freak In" - 7:08   
 "With Respect to John Coltrane" - 8:03   
 "Just Messin' Around" (Mike Barone) - 5:21   
 "Body and Soul" (Edward Heyman, Robert Sour, Frank Eyton, Johnny Green) - 6:08  
Recorded in Los Angeles, California in 1968

Personnel
Tom Scott - tenor saxophone, soprano saxophone, multivider
Mike Lang - piano, harpsichord
Chuck Domanico - bass
John Guerin - drums

References

Impulse! Records albums
Tom Scott (saxophonist) albums
1968 albums